Louis Reichenthal Gottschalk (February 21, 1899 in Brooklyn – June 23, 1975 in Chicago) was an American historian, an expert on Lafayette and the French Revolution. He taught for many years at the University of Chicago, where he was the Gustavus F. and Ann M. Swift Distinguished Service Professor of History.

Biography
He was born as Louis Gottschalk, the sixth of eight children of Morris and Anna (née Krystal) Gottschalk, Jewish immigrants to Brooklyn from Poland. He graduated from Cornell University with an A.B. in 1919, A.M. in 1920, and the Ph.D. in 1921, under the supervision of Carl L. Becker. During World War I, he served as an apprentice seaman from October 4, 1918 to November 11, 1918, a total of thirty eight days, at the Naval Unit at Cornell in Ithaca, New York. He taught briefly at the University of Illinois, and joined the University of Louisville faculty in 1923, but resigned in protest in 1927 after a friend and colleague in the history department was fired as part of an attempt by the university administration to abolish tenure. He joined the University of Chicago in 1927, was promoted to full professor in 1935, and chaired the history department from 1937 to 1942. He was given his endowed chair, the Gustavus F. and Ann M. Swift Distinguished Service Professorship of History, in 1959. In 1965, facing forced retirement from Chicago, he moved again to the University of Illinois at Chicago so that he could continue teaching.

From 1929 to 1943, he served as assistant editor of the Journal of Modern History; for three years following, he was acting editor.
He was president of the American Historical Association in 1953
and the second president of the American Society for Eighteenth-Century Studies.

He met poet Laura Riding, then known by her maiden name, Laura Reichenthal, while she was a student at Cornell and he was a graduate assistant there. They married on November 2, 1920, and he took her last name as his middle name. However, they divorced in 1925. He later married Fruma Kasden, in 1930; they had two sons. Fruma Gottschalk later taught Russian at the University of Chicago, and died in 1995.

Awards and honors
Gottschalk was a Guggenheim Fellow in 1928 and 1954, and a Center for Advanced study of the Behavioral Sciences fellow in 1957.
In 1953 he was honored as Chevalier in the Legion of Honor and in 1954 he won a Fulbright award.
He received honorary doctorates from the University of Toulouse, Hebrew Union College, and the University of Louisville.
In 1965 his students presented him with a festschrift, Ideas in History: Essays Presented to Louis Gottschalk by his Former Students, Duke University Press.

Gottschalk was an elected member of the American Academy of Arts and Sciences and the American Philosophical Society.

A series of lectures is named for him at the University of Louisville. The annual $1000 Louis Gottschalk Prize, named in his honor, is given by the American Society for Eighteenth-Century Studies to the author of "an outstanding historical or critical study".

Works
Gottschalk published seven volumes on the history of Gilbert du Motier, marquis de Lafayette as well as several other books on modern history and revolutions.
His books include:
The Consulate of Napoleon Bonaparte, Haldeman-Julius Co., 1925; Kessinger Publishing, 2007, 
The Era of the French Revolution (1715–1815), Houghton Mifflin Company, 1929; Surjeet Publications, 1979; online

Jean Paul Marat: a study in radicalism  New York: Greenberg, Publisher, Inc. 1927; Ayer Company Publishers, Incorporated, 1972, 
"Studies since 1920 of French Thought in the Period of the Enlightenment," The Journal of Modern History Vol. 4, No. 2, June 1932
Lady-in-waiting: the romance of Lafayette and Aglaé de Hunolstein, The Johns Hopkins press, 1939
Lafayette comes to America University of Chicago Press, 1935; Kessinger Publishing, 2008, 
"Carl Becker: Skeptic or Humanist?" The Journal of Modern History Vol. 18, No. 2, June 1946
"Our Vichy Fumble," The Journal of Modern History Vol. 20, No. 1, March 1948
Lafayette in America, 1777–1783, L'Esprit de Lafayette Society, 1975
Lafayette and the Close of the American Revolution The University of Chicago Press, 1942; UMI books on demand, 1998, 
Lafayette between the American and the French Revolution, 1783–1789 University of Chicago press
Lafayette In the French Revolution, University of Chicago press, 1969
Lafayette joins the American army, University of Chicago Press, 1974, 
Social Science Research Council. Committee on Historical Analysis
Lady In Waiting The Romance of Lafayette and Aglae de Hunolstein 
Lafayette : a guide to the letters, documents, and manuscripts in the…
The Life of Jean Paul Marat (Little blue book No. 433) Kessinger Publishing, 2006, 
The Foundations of the Modern World [1300–1775], Allen & Unwin, 1969
Toward the French Revolution: Europe & America in the Eighteenth-Century… Charles Scribner's Sons, 1973, 
The use of personal documents in history, anthropology, and sociology Editors Louis Reichenthal Gottschalk, Clyde Kluckhohn, Robert Cooley Angell, Social Science Research Council, 1945
Generalization in the Writing of History
Understanding history; a primer of historical method 

His papers are held at the University of Chicago.

References

Further reading
.

External links
The University of Chicago Photographic Archive

20th-century American historians
American people of Polish-Jewish descent
Jewish American historians
American male non-fiction writers
Cornell University alumni
1899 births
University of Chicago faculty
1975 deaths
University of Louisville faculty
University of Illinois Chicago faculty
University of Illinois Urbana-Champaign faculty
Historians of the French Revolution
20th-century American male writers
20th-century American Jews
World historians
Members of the American Philosophical Society